"Music Is the Key" is the debut single by J.M. Silk, and the first release issued on D.J. International Records in 1985.

The song was written by Steve "Silk" Hurley and successfully entered the US Dance chart, where it climbed to number 9, while scoring at number 18 for U.S. Maxi-Singles Sale.

Credits and personnel
Keith Nunnally – lead vocal
Steve Hurley – writer
J.M. Silk – producer, mix
Farley "Jack Master" Funk – mix
Rocky Jones – producer

Official versions
"Music Is The Key (House Key)" – 9:15
"Music Is The Key (Basement Key)" – 5:45
"Music Is The Key (Radio Version)" – 5:50
"Music Is The Key (Percussapella Key)" – 7:35

Charts

Weekly charts

See also
List of artists who reached number one on the US Dance chart

References

External links
 [ Steve "Silk" Hurley] on AllMusic
 [ J.M. Silk] on AllMusic

1985 debut singles
1985 songs
Steve "Silk" Hurley songs
Songs written by Steve "Silk" Hurley